Lawrence James Carberry (18 January 1936 – 26 June 2015) was an English professional footballer. Carberry started his career with local amateurs Bootle in 1953. His career began when Ipswich Town manager Alf Ramsey spotted him. He turned professional with Ipswich in May 1956.

During his career at Portman Road, he made over 250 appearances. He was ever-present in the side that won the League Championship in 1961–62, having previously won the 
Third Division South Championship in 1957 and the Division Two Championship
in 1960–61. In July 1965, he was transferred to Barrow. After a disappointing 17 league appearances in his two seasons at Holker Street, he joined Lancashire Combination side Burscough F.C. in 1967.

Personal life
Carberry's grandson Adam Blakeman has played for professional teams like Liverpool (2002-2009) and Bolton Wanderers (2009-2011-2013) and he currently plays for Chorley F.C.

Honours
Ipswich Town
Football League First Division: 1961–62
Football League Second Division: 1960–61
Football League Third Division South: 1956–57

Individual
Ipswich Town Hall of Fame: Inducted 2010

References

External links
Larry Carberry at Pride of Anglia
Larry Carberry profile at Ipswich Town Talk

1936 births
2015 deaths
Association football defenders
Ipswich Town F.C. players
Barrow A.F.C. players
Burscough F.C. players
Footballers from Liverpool
English footballers
English people of Irish descent